Lemercier (English equivalent Taylor) is a common French occupational surname. Notable people with the surname include: 

 Népomucène Lemercier (1771–1840), French poet and dramatist
 Pierre Lemercier, (fl 1532–1552), French architect/master mason
 Nicolas Lemercier, (1541–1637), French architect/master mason
 Jacques Lemercier (c.1585–1654), French architect and engineer
 Valérie Lemercier, French actress, director and singer
 Louis Lemercier de Neuville, French dramatic author and puppeteer
 Charles Lemercier de Longpré, baron d'Haussez, Minister of the Marine

See also
 Lemercier, Guadeloupe, a settlement in the commune of Le Moule